The twenty-third running of the Staffordshire Senior Cup consisted of nine clubs. It opened at the Aston Lower Grounds on 18 September 1899 and closed at the same venue on 26 April 1900.

The biggest wins in the competition 8–0, came at Walsall and Wolverhampton Wanderers.

The Final at the Victoria Ground, Stoke, a tight affair, saw Grassam score for Burslem Port Vale only to be equalised by a scrimmage for West Bromwich Albion. The attendance was just 500. In the replay at Aston Lower Grounds the First Division club West Bromwich Albion beat the Second Division side easily with goals from Simmons, Walker (2), Roberts (2) in front of 1000 spectators.

First round

Second round

Replay

Semi-final

Final

Replay

External links
County Cups page on the Staffordshire County FA website

County Cup competitions
Football in Staffordshire
Recurring sporting events established in 1877